Bates Settlement is a former settlement in New Brunswick.

It was located 2.26 km NE of Hartfield and 2.26 km SE of Campbell Settlement.

Currently, the road to the settlement serves as a logging road.

History

It was first named Oldham Settlement for Joseph Oldham, one of the first settlers in the area. It was later renamed Bates Settlement for settlers John and Lewis Bates.

Notable people

See also
 List of communities in New Brunswick

References

Communities in York County, New Brunswick